The South Bourke and Mornington Journal was a newspaper in Victoria (Australia) published under this title from 1865 until 25 August 1927. It was partially digitised alongside other Victorian community newspapers, as part of a World War I commemoration project. The digitised issues of this title are available on Trove with coverage from 10 January 1877 - 23 December 1920.

Initially published in Richmond, Victoria until 1920, in its latter years the Journal was published in Dandenong, Victoria. The Journal was named for the counties of Bourke and Mornington to the east and south of Melbourne.

Title history

References

External links
 
Digitised World War I Victorian newspapers from the State Library of Victoria

1865 establishments in Australia
1927 disestablishments in Australia
Defunct newspapers published in Victoria (Australia)
Publications established in 1865
Publications disestablished in 1927
Newspapers on Trove